You Me Bum Bum Train was an Interactive theatre performance devised by Kate Bond and Morgan Lloyd in 2004. The pair met as art students in Brighton, where they were studying illustration and film.

You Me Bum Bum Train gained critical acclaim in the United Kingdom when it was awarded the Oxford Samuel Beckett Theatre Trust prize while showing in a disused office in London. In 2010 it won the Evening Standard Theatre Award for outstanding newcomer. 

It returned in 2012 in a former postal depot in Holborn, and a new version of the show – at Empire House in Stratford, east London in 2012 – was nominated for an Olivier Award for Outstanding Achievement in an Affiliate Theatre.

In 2015 the show was mounted again, this time in at what had been Foyles bookshop on London's Charing Cross Road where their last show, started on 25 February 2016, finished on 29 April.

Overview
Visitors to the performance pass through a series of scenes of which they have no foreknowledge, in which they are either passive or where they must improvise a part without any preparation. Hanna Hanra, writing for Vice, described it as a series of "highly detailed, absurd real life scenarios following one another on a nonsense high-paced narrative".

The entertainment magazine Dazed & Confused reported; "What was one of London's more obtuse treasures is set to become one of Great Britain's proudest moments." The Times said; "It leaves you questioning everything, and it's lots of fun." Time Out magazine wrote; "My highlight of 2008 was You Me Bum Bum Train, if only real life were that interesting."

Controversies
You Me Bum Bum Train has provoked controversy due to the fact that none of the performers gets paid, though the directors stress that performers and crew are involved on a voluntary basis, that many are not trained professionals and that they are under no obligation to stay during performances.

The company was criticized for its ticketing system which caused problems for ticket buyers in June 2015.

In November 2015 the trade union Equity criticised their £150,000 Arts Council England funding as YMBBT were advertising for professional dancers but were not paying them, despite selling tickets "at rates typical of a West End show."

In June 2016 the trade union BECTU criticised YMBBT for "exploiting workers after advertising for unpaid production interns." BECTU launched an investigation concerning "the legality of the “outrageous” internships, which would see successful applicants work at least two days each week for a minimum four hours each day."

References

Theatre in the United Kingdom
Postmodern theatre
Fringe theatre
Amateur theatre
2004 plays
Organized events
British plays

External links